The communauté de communes des Rampennes was created on December 31, 2001, and is located in the Cher  département of the Centre region of France. It was created in January 2002. It was dissolved on December 31, 2012.

The Communauté de communes comprised the following communes:
 Levet
 Lissay-Lochy
 Sainte-Lunaise
 Senneçay
 Vorly

References 

Rampennes